{{Infobox election
| election_name = 2016 Oregon Secretary of State election
| percentage2 = 43.5%
| party2 = Democratic Party (United States)
| title = Secretary of State
| before_election = Jeanne Atkins
| before_party = Democratic Party (United States)
| after_election = Dennis Richardson
| after_party = Republican Party (United States)
| popular_vote2 = 834,529
| nominee2 = Brad Avakian
| country = Oregon
| type = presidential
| previous_election = 2012 Oregon Secretary of State election
| previous_year = 2012
| election_date = November 8, 2016
| next_election = 2020 Oregon Secretary of State election
| next_year = 2020
| image2 = 
| turnout = 
| image1 = 
| nominee1 = Dennis Richardson
| party1 = Republican Party (United States)
| popular_vote1 = 903,623
| percentage1 = 47.1%
| ongoing = No
| map_image          = 
| map_size           = 250px
| map_caption        = Richardson:      Avakian:      Tie:  
}}
The 2016 Oregon Secretary of State election''' was held on November 8, 2016, to elect the Oregon Secretary of State. Incumbent Democratic Secretary of State Jeanne Atkins declined to seek election; she was appointed in March 2015 following Kate Brown's ascension to the governorship.

Republican Dennis Richardson defeated Democrat Brad Avakian to become the first Republican elected to statewide office in Oregon since 2002, and the first to hold this office since 1985.

Candidates

Democratic primary 

 Brad Avakian, Oregon Commissioner of Labor and Industries, former state senator and Representative, candidate for 2012 Oregon's 1st congressional district special election
 Richard Devlin, state senator and former state representative
 Val Hoyle, state representative

Results

Republican primary 

 Sid Leiken, Lane County Commissioner
 Dennis Richardson, former state representative

Results

Independent Party primary 

 Paul Damian Wells, machinist and perennial candidate

Results

Other candidates 

 Sharon Durbin, candidate for U.S. House District 2 in 2014 (Libertarian)
 Michael P. Marsh, perennial candidate (Constitution)
 Alan Zundel, former political scientist and former professor at the University of Nevada, Las Vegas (Pacific Green)

Endorsements

Polling

Results

References 

Secretary of State
Oregon Secretary of State elections
Oregon
November 2016 events in the United States